An Airplane Carried Me to Bed is the first and only album by Sky Sailing, a project by Adam Young. The album comprises some of his early recordings from before he started Owl City.

Track listing 

"Sailboats", was first released under another project 'Seagull Orchestra' but was re-recorded and changed somewhat for release under Sky Sailing. The title of the album was also taken from this track, the lyrics for which can be heard at the start of one of the verses in the song.

Personnel 
Sky Sailing
 Adam Young – vocals, keyboards, piano, guitars, bass, drums, programming, producers, engineer, audio mixer

Additional musicians and production
 Steve Bursky – executive producer, management
 Greg Calbi – mastering
 Rob Helmstetter – art direction

Charts and certification

Weekly charts

References

2010 albums
Sky Sailing albums